Patiriella, commonly known as carpet sea star, is a genus of sea stars of the family Asterinidae.

Description and characteristics 
Native to southern Australia, New Zealand, and southern America (Argentina and Chile), they are most often found in intertidal pools, and can vary greatly in colour between individuals. It contains the following species:

Species
 Patiriella brevispina H.L. Clark, 1938
 Patiriella calcar (Lamarck, 1816)
 Patiriella dyscrita (H.L. Clark, 1923)
 Patiriella gunni (Gray, 1840)
 Patiriella inornata Livingstone, 1933
 Patiriella medius O' Loughlin, Waters & Roy, 2003
 Patiriella mortenseni O'Loughlin, Waters & Roy, 2002
 Patiriella obscura Dartnall, 1971
 Patiriella occidens O' Loughlin, Waters & Roy, 2003
 Patiriella oliveri (Benham, 1911)
 Patiriella oriens O' Loughlin, Waters & Roy, 2003
 Patiriella pacifica (Hayashi, 1977)
 Patiriella paradoxa Campbell & Rowe, 1997
 Patiriella regularis (Verrill, 1867)

References

 BOLD Systems

 
Asteroidea genera
Taxa named by Addison Emery Verrill